William Genders (5 January 1890 – 7 February 1971) was a British cyclist. He competed in two events at the 1920 Summer Olympics. Genders served in Belgium with the Royal Army Service Corps during the First World War.

References

External links
 

1890 births
1971 deaths
British male cyclists
Olympic cyclists of Great Britain
Cyclists at the 1920 Summer Olympics
Sportspeople from Sutton Coldfield
Sportspeople from Birmingham, West Midlands
British Army personnel of World War I
Royal Army Service Corps soldiers